Bhandaria  is one of the administrative blocks of Garhwa district, Jharkhand state, India.

About Bhandaria Garhwa Jharkhand 
Bhandaria a Taluka/Block, close to Ramanujganj, is located 65 km from Garhwa. Bhandaria is located in south of Garhwa. It is one of the border location of Jharkhand. There is no network access at this location even after having huge population.

Languages
Languages spoken here include Asuri, an Austroasiatic language spoken by approximately 17 000 in India, largely in the southern part of Palamu; and Bhojpuri, a tongue in the Bihari language group with almost 40 000 000 speakers, written in both the Devanagari and Kaithi scripts.

Facilities
Market:   A small market called as  Bhandaria bazar is situated in middle of the block.

See also
Garhwa district
Jharkhand

References

Garhwa district
Community development blocks in Jharkhand
Community development blocks in Garhwa district
Cities and towns in Garhwa district